{{Infobox person
| name             = Kenneth Kendall
| image            = 
| caption          = 
| birthname        =
| birth_date       = 
| birth_place      = British India
| death_date       = 
| death_place      = Cowes, Isle of Wight, England
| education        =
| occupation       = Journalist, television presenter
| alias            =
| title            =
| family           =
| spouse           =
| domestic_partner = Mark Fear
| children         =
| relatives        =
| nationality      = British
| years_active     = 1948–2012
| credits          = BBC NewsTreasure Hunt
| module       = 
}}

Kenneth Kendall (7 August 1924 – 14 December 2012) was a British broadcaster. He worked for many years as a newsreader for the BBC, where he was a contemporary of fellow newsreaders Richard Baker and Robert Dougall. He is also remembered as the host of the Channel 4 game show Treasure Hunt, which ran between 1982 and 1989, as well as the host of The World Tonight in the 1968 science fiction film 2001: A Space Odyssey.

 Early life 
Kendall was born in India where his father, Frederic William Kendall (d. 30 May 1945), worked. He was brought up in Cornwall. Kendall was educated at Felsted School in Essex, England. He read Modern Languages at Corpus Christi College, Oxford, for one year before being called up to the British Army.

Military service
Kendall joined the Coldstream Guards where he was commissioned as a lieutenant. He arrived in Normandy ten days after D-Day but was wounded about a month later. In 1945, he was among 100,000 British military personnel sent to Palestine. In 1946, he was demobilised from the Guards as a captain.

Broadcasting career
After leaving the army, Kendall returned to Oxford to complete his Modern Language degree. He hoped to join the Foreign Office but instead joined the BBC in 1948 as a radio newsreader. In 1954, he transferred to television. Although he was not the first newsreader on BBC television, Kendall was the first to appear in front of a camera reading the news in 1955. As he was employed on a freelance basis by the BBC, he also worked as an actor for a repertory company based in Crewe, and briefly at the menswear retailer Austin Reed in Regent Street, where he met actor John Inman and offered him a job in the Crewe theatre company.

Kendall became known for his elegant dress sense and was voted best-dressed newsreader by Style International and No.1 newscaster by Daily Mirror readers in 1979. He left the BBC in 1961, and from 1961 to 1969 was a freelance newsreader, working occasionally for ITN and presenting Southern Television's Day By Day. He appeared as himself in the Adam Adamant episode "The Doomsday Plan", in which he is kidnapped and impersonated. He also appeared in the Doctor Who serial The War Machines.

He rejoined the BBC in 1969 and finally retired from newsreading on 23 December 1981.  Kendall's retirement allowed him to work on the popular Channel 4 programme Treasure Hunt throughout its first run (1982–1989), which featured Anneka Rice as a "skyrunner". He also presented the television programme Songs of Praise.

Later life
Soon after retirement from news reading, Kendall lent his voice to the BBC Micro as part of Acorn Computers' hardware speech synthesis system.

In 2010 he took part in BBC's series The Young Ones in which six well-known people in their 70s and 80s attempt to overcome some of the problems of ageing by harking back to the 1970s.

Personal life
Kendall lived in Cowes on the Isle of Wight with his partner Mark Fear, whom he had been with since 1989. Fear was the owner of a marine art gallery and a beekeeper. The couple entered into a civil partnership in 2006.

Death
Kendall died on 14 December 2012, following a stroke a few weeks previously. On 29 April 2013, his partner Mark Fear was found hanged aged 55. An inquest concluded that he had died by suicide because he was "overcome by grief".

FilmographyThe Reckless Moment (1949) – Man (uncredited)Scotland Yard Evidence in Concrete (1961) TV news reader on Decca television screenThe Brain (1962) – TV Newscaster (uncredited)Doctor Who: The War Machines (1966) – Himself (Credited, TV cameo)
They Came from Beyond Space (1967) – Commentator
The Exorcism – from the Dead of Night BBC TV series. (1972) (Credited) 
2001: A Space Odyssey (1968) – BBC-12 Announcer (uncredited)

References

External links

Interview with Kenneth Kendall in 2011

1924 births
2012 deaths
Alumni of Corpus Christi College, Oxford
BBC newsreaders and journalists
British Army personnel of World War II
British game show hosts
British male journalists
Coldstream Guards officers
British LGBT broadcasters
British LGBT journalists
People educated at Felsted School
Television personalities from Cornwall
Gay military personnel
British people in colonial India